Ed Marinaro (born March 31, 1950) is an American actor and former NFL player. In 1971, he was a unanimous All-American and finished as a runner-up to Pat Sullivan for the Heisman Trophy, and from 2010 to 2011 starred in the football comedy series, Blue Mountain State. He is also known as a regular cast member on Hill Street Blues, playing Officer Joe Coffey for five seasons (1981–1986).

Career

Football
Marinaro played high school football in New Milford, New Jersey for the New Milford High School Knights.

Marinaro played college football at Cornell University, where he was a three-time All-American, and set over 16 NCAA records. He was the first running back in NCAA history to run for 4,000 career rushing yards and led the nation in rushing in 1971.

Marinaro was runner-up to Pat Sullivan for the Heisman Trophy in 1971, the highest finish for an Ivy League player since the league de-emphasized football in the mid-1950s. Princeton's Dick Kazmaier won the award in 1951 when the Ivy was still considered a major football conference. Marinaro won the 1971 Maxwell Award and the UPI College Football Player of the Year as the top player in college football. He holds four NCAA records: most rushes per game in a season (39.6 in 1971), career average carries per game (34.0, 1969–71), most rushing yards per game over an entire career (174.6, 1969–71), and earliest game reaching 1,000 rushing yards (5th, 1971).

While at Cornell, Marinaro was a member of Psi Upsilon and was selected for membership in the Sphinx Head Society. He went on to play professional football for six seasons with the Minnesota Vikings, New York Jets and Seattle Seahawks, appearing in Super Bowl VIII and Super Bowl IX with the Vikings. He scored 13 touchdowns over his career.

Acting
After leaving football, Marinaro became an actor. He has been a cast member on a number of television series, including Laverne & Shirley and Sisters. He joined the regular cast of Hill Street Blues in 1981, playing officer Joe Coffey until 1986. Furthermore he co-presented the Crystal Light USA National Aerobic Championship. He also appeared in the 2006 film Circus Island.

Marinaro played the head football coach for three seasons on Spike TV's comedy, Blue Mountain State.

In September 2019, Marinaro was a guest on Turner Classic Movies. With Ben Mankiewicz, he appeared in wraparounds and provided introductions for films in a college football-themed series.

Personal life
Marinaro is married to fitness expert Tracy York and has one son.

Honors
Marinaro was inducted to the College Football Hall of Fame in 1991.

In January 2020, Marinaro was named by ESPN as one of the "150 greatest players in college football's 150-year history," ranking at number 126. He was one of only three Ivy League players on the list. ESPN wrote of Marinaro, "It is up for debate as to whether Marinaro is the last great running back produced by the Ivy League. What is not up for debate are the numbers that illustrate his production."

Filmography

Film

Television

See also
List of NCAA Division I FBS career rushing touchdowns leaders
 List of NCAA major college football yearly rushing leaders
 List of NCAA major college football yearly scoring leaders

References

External links

 
 
 

1950 births
Living people
20th-century American male actors
21st-century American male actors
All-American college football players
American football running backs
American male film actors
American male television actors
American people of Italian descent
College Football Hall of Fame inductees
Cornell Big Red football players
Male actors from New Jersey
Male actors from New York City
Maxwell Award winners
Minnesota Vikings players
New York Jets players
People from New Milford, New Jersey
Players of American football from New Jersey
Players of American football from New York (state)
Seattle Seahawks players